Midsummer Madness is a 1921 American silent drama film produced by Famous Players-Lasky and released by Paramount Pictures. It is based on the novel His Friend and His Wife by Cosmo Hamilton.

The film was directed by William C. deMille, and stars Jack Holt, Conrad Nagel, Lois Wilson, and Lila Lee. It is the film debut of Ethel Wales. A copy of Midsummer Madness is preserved at the Library of Congress.

Cast
Jack Holt as Bob Meredith
Conrad Nagel as Julian Osborne
Lois Wilson as Margaret Meredith
Lila Lee as Daisy Osborne
Betty Francisco as Mary Miller
Claire McDowell as Mrs. Osborne
Peaches Jackson as Peggy Meredith
Ethel Wales as Mrs. Hicks
Charles Ogle as Caretaker
Lillian Leighton as Caretaker's Wife
George Kuwa as Japanese Servant

References

External links

 
 
Page devoted to the film

1921 romantic drama films
American romantic drama films
American silent feature films
American black-and-white films
Films based on British novels
Paramount Pictures films
Films directed by William C. deMille
1921 films
1920s American films
Silent romantic drama films
Silent American drama films